Rachel Neylan (born 9 March 1982) is an Australian professional road cyclist, who rides for UCI Women's Continental Team Cofidis. She won a silver medal at the 2012 World Championships in the women's road race event. She won the inaugural women's Cadel Evans Great Ocean Road Race in January 2015.

Early life
Neylan was born in Sydney, Australia. She competed in athletics throughout her teenage years, before taking up rowing. She studied at the University of Sydney after which she became a physiotherapist. Between 2006 and 2007, she worked as a physiotherapist for the Australian rowing team.

Career
In late 2007, Neylan was accepted onto the development program at the South Australian Sports Institute. She rode domestic Australian races throughout 2008 and rode in both the USA and Europe during the 2009 season, before signing with Team System Data for the 2010 season. During the season she finished fourth at the Australian National Road Race Championships, however was forced out of the 2010 UCI Road World Championships after crashing on a training ride in Italy resulting in a broken jaw.

Neylan signed for the  team for the 2011 season. However, she struggled with a knee injury during the 2013 season, and after recovering was hit by a car in 2014 which injured her knee a second time.

Neylan competed in the road race at the 2016 Summer Olympics, finishing in 22nd position.

Neylan rode for  during the 2019 season, during which time she won a stage at the Gracia–Orlová and recorded two more Top 10 finishes in the WorldTour. At the end of 2019, Virtu Cycling closed the women's team and Neylan signed for new Spanish outfit . However one of the major backers of the team pulled their funding, preventing Neylan from taking part in the races required for her to qualify for the 2020 Summer Olympics. In August 2021, Neylan finished sixth overall in the Ladies Tour of Norway.

Major results

2009
 6th Time trial, Oceania Road Cycling Championships
 9th Overall Women's Tour of New Zealand
2010
 9th Overall Tour Féminin en Limousin
 10th Emakumeen Saria
2011
 9th Overall Women's Tour of New Zealand
2012
 2nd  Road race, UCI Road World Championships
 3rd  Road race, Oceania Road Cycling Championships
 3rd Road race, National Road Championships
 4th Overall Tour Cycliste Féminin International de l'Ardèche
2014
 5th Overall Trophée d'Or Féminin
2015
 1st  Overall Trophée d'Or Féminin
1st Stage 3 
 1st Cadel Evans Great Ocean Road Race
 2nd Road race, National Road Championships
 4th Road race, Oceania Road Cycling Championships
 6th Overall Women's Tour Down Under
 7th Overall Women's Tour of New Zealand
2016
 1st Grand Prix de Plumelec-Morbihan Dames
 2nd Cadel Evans Great Ocean Road Race
 3rd Road race, National Road Championships
 5th La Classique Morbihan
2017
 2nd Erondegemse Pijl
 7th Overall Tour Cycliste Féminin International de l'Ardèche
2019
 3rd Overall Women's Tour Down Under
 5th Overall Gracia–Orlová
1st Stage 2b
 7th Cadel Evans Great Ocean Road Race
2020
 10th Giro dell'Emilia Internazionale Donne Elite
2021
 2nd La Choralis Fourmies Féminine
 3rd Giro dell'Emilia Internazionale Donne Elite
 6th Overall Ladies Tour of Norway

References

External links
 
 
 
 

1982 births
Living people
Australian female cyclists
Cyclists at the 2016 Summer Olympics
Olympic cyclists of Australia
Australian physiotherapists